Blue River is a 1995 American made-for-television action film directed by Larry Elikann and starring Sam Elliott, Jerry O'Connell, Susan Dey, Nick Stahl, and Neal McDonough. It is based on a novel of the same name by Ethan Canin.

Premise
Edward is a teenager living in a family the father abandoned years before. His mother has become a Christian fundamentalist and courts a self-righteous school principal.

Cast
 Sam Elliott as Henry Howland
 Jerry O'Connell as Lawrence Sellars
 Susan Dey as Mrs. Sellers
 Nick Stahl as Young Edward
 Neal McDonough as Edward Sellars

Reception
Writing for the South Florida Sun Sentinel, Tom Jicha said that: "Blue River meanders aimlessly for a couple of hours without ever fully paying off the audience."

References

External links
 
 

1995 television films
1995 films
1990s English-language films
Fox network original films
1995 drama films
Films shot in North Carolina
Films directed by Larry Elikann
American drama television films
1990s American films